Hammel is a town in Denmark.

Hammel may also refer to:


Places 
 Hammel Municipality, Denmark
 A town district in Neusäß, Bavaria, Germany
 Hammel and Millgrove, Ohio, United States, extinct towns
 Hammel, Wisconsin, United States, a town
 3530 Hammel, asteroid

People 
 Hammel (surname), a list of people surnamed Hammel or Hammell
 Hammel Madden Deroche (1840–1916), Canadian lawyer and politician

Other uses 
 Hammel, Green and Abrahamson, an architecture firm
 Hammel (automobile), an early Danish car

See also 
 Ras Hammel
 Hammels, Queens, New York City
 
 Hamal (disambiguation)
 Hamel (disambiguation)
 Hammelburg, Bavaria, Germany